Lycée Michelet (Michelet High school), is an establishment located in Vanves (Hauts-de-Seine), bringing together middle school, general education high school and classe préparatoire aux grandes écoles in buildings classified as Monument historique (historical monuments) and surrounded by a park of 17 hectares. It originated from the 1853 establishment of the "Petit collège of Lycée Louis-le-Grand".

Notable people

Professors

 Jean Poperen (politician, deputy),
 Maurice Druon (writer, author of The Accursed Kings, academician, former Minister of Cultural Affairs),
 Pierre Chaunu (history and geography) from 1951 to 1956,
 Émile Schuffenecker (drawing)
 Jean-Paul Coche (olympic athlete)

Students

 Jean Aujame (artist),
 Francis Blanche (actor and comedian),
 Pierre Bonnard (artist),
 Jean Borotra (Davis Cup winner),
 Francis Bouygues (founder of Bouygues),
 Albin Chalandon (former french minister of housing),
 Jean-Claude Chermann (scientist, co-discover of HIV virus),
 Jean Dausset (biologist, Nobel Prize winner),
 Jean-Paul Delahaye (computer scientist and mathematician),
 Robert Delaunay, 1885-1941, (artist),
 Paul Deschanel (Former president of France),
 Alexandre Millerand (lawyer and former president of France),
 Dieudonné M'bala M'bala (comedian),
 Maurice Donnay (French playwright),
 Maurice Druon (French writer and academician),
 Jean Glavany (former minister of agriculture, deputy for the Hautes Pyrénées),
 Fernand Gregh (poet).
 Hector Guimard (architect),
 Victor Hugo (writer)
 René Huyghe (professor at the Collège de France and member of the French Academy),
 Jacques Maillot (entrepreneur, founder of the Nouvelles Frontières company),
 Jean-Michel Jarre (musician),
 Serge Lama (singer),
 Robert Merle (writer, Prix Goncourt 1949),
 Georges Méliès (inventor of the first special effects in the cinema),
 Serge Moati (journalist, writer, television host, actor, director, screenwriter, producer),
 Hervé Novelli (French politician),
 Gaston Palewski (former Minister of Scientific Research and President of the Constitutional Council (France)),
 Jean-François Parot (diplomat and writer),
 Michel Pastoureau (medieval historian),
 Émile Picard (French mathematician and academician),
 Maurice Ronet (actor, writer and director),
 Mohammad Zaher Shah (last king of Afghanistan)
 Eugene H. Trinh (physicist and NASA astronaut),
 André Truong Trong Thi (creator of the first microcomputer in the world (1973), inventor of the first electronic archiving system),
 Maxime Weygand (general and academician),
 Jean-Pierre Melville (director and screenwriter)

References

External links

 Lycée Michelet 

Lycées in Hauts-de-Seine